Kibada is an administrative ward in the Kigamboni district of the Dar es Salaam Region of Tanzania.  The place is also famous for mangos cultivation.

In 2016 the Tanzania National Bureau of Statistics report there were 10,750 people in the ward, from 8,585 in 2012.

References

Temeke District
Wards of Dar es Salaam Region